Laird Morton Smith (16 July 1913 – 27 February 1999) was an Australian rules footballer who played with St Kilda and Richmond in the Victorian Football League (VFL).

Smith, a Melbourne High School product, started his career at South Melbourne but only played for them at reserves level. A rover, he was second in the St Kilda goal-kicking in 1936 and 1937, with 31 and 30 goals respectively. He appeared in the 1940 VFL Grand Final for Richmond, on a half forward flank, but finished on the losing team. From 1942 to 1944 he didn't play a senior game, owing to his wartime service. He was appointed secretary of the Geelong Football Club in 1947 and also later served St Kilda as an administrator.

References

External links

1913 births
1999 deaths
Australian military personnel of World War II
Australian rules footballers from Victoria (Australia)
Richmond Football Club players
St Kilda Football Club players